The men's 10,000 metres at the 2004 Summer Olympics as part of the athletics program were held at the Athens Olympic Stadium on August 20. No preliminary rounds were held at this distance, since the number of competitors allowed a direct final.

The Ethiopians were in control throughout the distance. A leading group of five runners crystallized. As Kenenisa Bekele and Sileshi Sihine turned up the pace with two kilometres left, Zersenay Tadese, Boniface Kiprop Toroitich and reigning Olympic champion Haile Gebrselassie, who was running with a calf injury, were not able to keep up. Bekele, the world record holder, assured his victory with a brilliant Olympic record finish (27:05.10 minutes), completing the final 400 metres in less than 54 seconds.

Records
, the existing World and Olympic records were as follows.

The following records were established during the competition:

Qualification
The qualification period for athletics was 1 January 2003 to 9 August 2004. For the men's 10,000 metres, each National Olympic Committee was permitted to enter up to three athletes that had run the race in 27:49.00 or faster during the qualification period. If an NOC had no athletes that qualified under that standard, one athlete that had run the race in 28:06.00 or faster could be entered.

Schedule
All times are Greece Standard Time (UTC+2)

Results

References

External links
 IAAF Athens 2004 Olympic Coverage

M
10,000 metres at the Olympics
Men's events at the 2004 Summer Olympics